Brigham Taylor (born 1967) is a film producer for Walt Disney Pictures. He has worked for Disney since 1994, and became a producer for the company in 2014. He co-produced the live-action films The Jungle Book and Christopher Robin.

Life and career
Brigham Taylor started his career as a volunteer at the Sundance Film Festival and the Filmmakers Lab, from which he observed filmmakers work. In 1994, Taylor became an production executive for Walt Disney Pictures, a position from which he oversaw live-action films from the company such as the Pirates of the Caribbean franchise, with Taylor involving producer Jerry Bruckheimer and director Gore Verbinski into the first film. In 2003, he pitched to Disney a film titled Christopher Robin, which is based on Winnie the Pooh and focusing on a grown-up Christopher Robin reuniting with Pooh. However, since Disney was developing other Pooh projects at the time, the project wasn't green-lighted for a film.

On August 4, 2014, Taylor was promoted from production executive to producer, working exclusively for Disney's live-action projects. From his new position, Tayor acted as an executive producer on the 2015 film Tomorrowland. He also acted as a co-producer on Disney's The Jungle Book, a remake of Walt Disney's 1967 animated film of the same name, itself based on Rudyard Kipling's eponymous works. As a kid, Taylor was a fan of the original film, and thus, he and director/co-producer Jon Favreau aimed to balance Kipling's original works with the 1967 film. The film was met with universal acclaim, with Taylor and Favreau earning a Feature Film nomination at the British Academy Children's Awards. In 2017, Taylor executive-produced Pirates of the Caribbean: Dead Men Tell No Tales, the fifth entry in the Pirates of the Caribbean franchise. In 2018, Taylor produced Disney's Christopher Robin. Taylor was convinced to resurrect the project some time after becoming a producer by co-producer Kristin Burr.

Taylor produced the live-action remake of Lady and the Tramp, which was one of the first films to be released on Disney's streaming service, Disney+. Taylor is set to produce a live-action adaptation of The Sword in the Stone, which will also be released on Disney+, as well as a sequel to The Jungle Book. Taylor will also co-produce a sequel to The Rocketeer. He was originally set to produce a remake of The Haunted Mansion, alongside Guillermo del Toro, but the two left the project by August 2020.

As of 2016, Taylor heads his own production company, "TaylorMade Productions", also known as "Taylor Made". The company helped produce The Jungle Book and Christopher Robin, and co-produced Lady and the Tramp.

Filmography

Awards and nominations

References

American film producers
Disney executives
Living people
1967 births